Vulture in the Sun is a 1971 spy thriller novel by the British writer John Bingham. The protagonist is an agent of British intelligence operating out of Cyprus. It features the fictional head of British intelligence Ducane, who recurs in several of the author's novels.

References

Bibliography
 Reilly, John M. Twentieth Century Crime & Mystery Writers. Springer, 2015.

1971 British novels
British thriller novels
Novels by John Bingham
Novels set in Cyprus
British spy novels
Victor Gollancz Ltd books